Old Sour is a sauce used in The Bahamas and Key West, Florida. Old Sour sauce originated in The Bahamas, and was originally prepared using key lime juice, salt and Bird peppers. It is made from an aged (fermented) mixture lime (fruit) juice and salt. Old Sour has a salty and acidic flavor. Hot sauce is sometimes used as an ingredient to add additional flavor. Conchs, natives of Key West use the sauce for a variety of food including to flavor seafood dishes. The sauce may have been developed to preserve lime juice.

See also
 Switcha
 List of sauces

References

Sauces
Limes (fruit)
Bahamian cuisine
Florida cuisine